What's Done in the Dark is an 2007 American stage play written, directed and produced by Tyler Perry. The show first opened in September 2006. The play focuses on two nurses, one of whom is a single mother and the other of whom is having an affair with a doctor, and an eccentric hypochondriac patient who is in fact, Mr. Brown. It stars Tamela Mann as Cora and David Mann as Mr. Brown. The live performance released on DVD (February 12, 2008) was taped in Charlotte at the Ovens Auditorium on May 3 - 6, 2007.

Plot
Mr. Brown faints right before he and Cora are to fly to Memphis for a televised revival and she rushes him to the emergency room, where a bunch of patients' and doctors' secrets come to light. Brenda, a new admissions clerk at the hospital, is struggling to take care of her son Calvin as a single parent; then Calvin gets shot while trying to hustle money on the streets. Kerry, the head nurse, discovers that the doctor she thought she was going to marry already has a wife and baby-on-the-way...and expects to keep seeing Kerry on the side. Mr. and Mrs. Lovett discover that one gave the other an STD. Trudy, a psychotic nurse, has a crush on Dr. Harris—who figures out that Mr. Brown was faking his illness the whole time!

Shows

Cast
 David Mann as Mr. Brown
 Tamela Mann as Cora
 Chandra Currelley-Young as Brenda
 Ahmad Jamal McGhee as Calvin Rhodes Jr.
 Cassi Davis as Nurse Nancy Williams
 Latrice Pace as Nurse Nancy Williams (filmed version)
 D'Atra Hicks as Nurse Trudy
 Julie Dickens as Nurse Kerry Johnson
 Shonda Vincent as Nurse Kerry Johnson (filmed version)
 Chantell D. Christopher as Mrs. Bowman
 Terrell Carter as Dr. Paul Bowman
 Dino Hanson as Calvin Rhodes Sr.
 Allen Payne as Dr. Harris
 Christian Keyes as Dr. Harris (filmed version)
 Ryan Gentles as Nick Lovett
 Matisha Baldwin as Angela Lovett

The Band 

 Ronnie Garrett - Musical Director / Bass Guitar
 Anthony Lockett - Guitar
 Marcus Williams - Drums
 Mike Logan - Keyboards
 Michael Burton - Saxophone / Keyboards

Musical Numbers 
All songs written and/or produced by Tyler Perry and Elvin D. Ross.

 "What's Done in the Dark" - Nancy
 "You Ain't Seen Nothing Yet" - Paul
 "Struggle No More" - Calvin Jr.
 "Jehovah Jireh" - Brenda
 "Church Medley" - 
 "I Gotta Go Through" - Brenda
 "I Know It Was the Blood" - Nancy
 "I'm on the Battlefield" - Mr. Brown
 "Trouble in My Way" - Cora
 "Jesus Will Fix It" - Cora
 "Step Aside" - Cora
 "Remember Your Vows" - Nancy
 "If Only You Knew" - Trudy

Trivia
 Tamela Mann, David Mann, Chandra Currelley, D'Atra Hicks, Cassi Davis, Terrell Carter, Chantell D. Christopher and Demetria McKinney have starred in several Tyler Perry productions, films, and television series. 
 Christian Keyes and Ryan Gentles notably starred as Sonny and Nate, respectively, in Madea Goes to Jail.
 Latrice Pace was a part of the most well-known cast of I Know I've Been Changed.
 Ahmad Jamal McGhee was a part of the cast of Madea's Class Reunion.
 On the DVD recording and the latter majority of the tour, the roles of Nurse Nancy, Dr. Harris, and Nurse Kerry were portrayed by Latrice Pace, Christian Keyes, and Shonda Vincent, respectively. Cassi Davis, Allen Payne, and Demetria McKinney all left the show in 2006 for House of Payne.
 Brenda and Calvin's storyline was later adapted as the main focus of the film version of Meet the Browns, starring Angela Bassett, and Lance Gross as Michael Rhodes Jr. Demetria Mckinney also portrayed Angela Lovett

External Links 

 Tyler Perry's Official website

Plays by Tyler Perry
2007 plays
African-American plays